= Ukiah Rancheria, California =

Unincorporated community in California, United States

Ukiah Rancheria
- Unincorporated community
- Location in California Ukiah Rancheria (the United States)
- Coordinates: 39°05′25″N 123°09′34″W
- Country: United States
- State: California
- County: Mendocino
- Elevation: 636 ft (194 m)

Ukiah Rancheria is an unincorporated community in Mendocino County, California, United States. It lies at an elevation of 636 feet (194 m).
